West Pontianak (Pontianak Barat in Indonesian) is a district (Indonesian:kecamatan) of the city of Pontianak. It lies on the south bank of the Kapuas Besar River and covers an area of 16.47 km2. It had a population of 123,029 at the 2010 census; the latest official estimate of population (as at mid 2019) is 143,060.

References

Pontianak
Populated places in West Kalimantan